Waimalu is a census-designated place (CDP) in Honolulu County, Hawaii, United States. The population was 13,817 at the 2020 census.

Geography
Waimalu is located at  (21.399150, -157.948432).

Demographics

As of the census of 2000, there were 29,371 people, 10,524 households, and 7,514 families residing in the CDP. The racial makeup of the CDP was 17.08% White, 2.33% African American, 0.26% Native American, 55.32% Asian, 5.63% Pacific Islander, 1.10% from other races, and 18.27% from two or more races. Hispanic or Latino of any race were 5.97% of the population.

There were 10,524 households, out of which 29.2% had children under the age of 18 living with them, 55.9% were married couples living together, 11.1% had a female householder with no husband present, and 28.6% were non-families. 21.0% of all households were made up of individuals, and 3.4% had someone living alone who was 65 years of age or older.  The average household size was 2.78 and the average family size was 3.26.

In the CDP the population was spread out, with 21.4% under the age of 18, 9.5% from 18 to 24, 31.5% from 25 to 44, 27.5% from 45 to 64, and 10.1% who were 65 years of age or older.  The median age was 38 years. For every 100 females, there were 102.6 males.  For every 100 females age 18 and over, there were 102.7 males.

The median income for a household in the CDP was $61,210, and the median income for a family was $70,740. Males had a median income of $40,949 versus $32,090 for females. The per capita income for the CDP was $25,913. About 4.1% of families and 5.9% of the population were below the poverty line, including 7.9% of those under age 18 and 3.0% of those age 65 or over.

Education
Waimalu is within the Hawaii Department of Education.

Public elementary schools in the 2010 CDP include Pearl Ridge Elementary School. Three other  elementary schools (Momilani, Waimalu, and Waiau Elementary School) were in the Waimalu CDP as of the 2000 U.S. Census, but as of the 2010 U.S. Census are now in the Pearl City CDP.

Pearl City High School was located in the Waimalu CDP in 2000, but as of 2010 it is in Pearl City CDP.

Our Savior Lutheran School, a K-8 private school, is in the Waimalu CDP.

Legends
There are several geographic legends of Waimalu in the Ewa Area between the East Loch of Pearl Harbor and the terraces in the Waimalu Stream, Waipi Stream which is east of Waiua Pond. Accounts of Heiau, the Waimalu Burial Cave, Paul Marin, and Paunana- loa Huewai-pi, are also included.

References

Census-designated places in Honolulu County, Hawaii